Tony Lamont McGee (born April 21, 1971) is a former American football tight end in the National Football League (NFL) for the Cincinnati Bengals, Dallas Cowboys and New York Giants. He played college football for the University of Michigan.

Early years
McGee was born in Terre Haute, Indiana, in 1971.  He attended South Vigo High School in Terre Haute. As a junior, he collected 39 receptions for 890 yards.

As a senior, he was a two-way player. On offense, he played tight end, making 27 catches for 670 yards and four touchdowns, while contributing to his team posting 4,133 yards. On defense, he played defensive end and had 60 tackles, 10 sacks and nine tackles for loss. He received Chicago Sun Times Indiana Lineman of the Year and SuperPrep All-American honors. He also lettered in basketball.

College career
McGee accepted a football scholarship from the University of Michigan, playing as a tight end from 1989 to 1992. As a freshman, he only saw action on special teams.

As a sophomore, McGee saw action on special teams and registered one catch for nine yards as a reserve tight end. As a junior, he appeared in every game as a reserve tight end, catching three passes for 39 yards. 

Although he only had three receptions going into his senior year, he started all 12 games at tight end for the undefeated 1992 Michigan Wolverines football team that compiled a 9–0–3 record.  During the 1992 season, he caught 38 passes (second on the team) for 467 yards and six receiving touchdowns (second on the team). He had the best game of his collegiate career in Michigan's victory over Washington in the 1993 Rose Bowl with six receptions for 117 yards and two touchdowns.

Professional football

Cincinnati Bengals
McGee was selected by the Cincinnati Bengals in the second round (37th overall pick) of the 1993 NFL Draft. As a rookie in 1993, McGee was the Bengals' starting tight end in 15 games and caught 44 passes for 525 yards. He missed the game against the Houston Oilers with a back contusion.

In 1995, McGee was reunited with his Michigan head coach Gary Moeller who joined the Bengals as an assistant coach. McGee had his best season with 55 catches (fourth in the league for tight ends) for 754 yards (third in the league for tight ends) and four touchdowns. He had a career-high 118 receiving yards against the Indianapolis Colts.

In 1997, he finished third on the team with 34 receptions for 414 yards and 6 touchdowns (third in the league for tight ends). In 1998, he began to focus more on blocking for running back Corey Dillon. In 2000, he suffered a left ankle fracture, causing him to miss the last 2 games and end his 117 consecutive starts streak.

In December 2001, the Bengals placed McGee on the injured reserve list with a sprained medial collateral ligament in his left knee. In 2002, after the drafting of tight end Matt Schobel, with McGee recovering from a knee injury and the team looking to save money under the salary cap, he was released on April 25.

He appeared in 136 games for the Bengals (134 as a starter) and caught 299 passes for 3,795 yards and 20 touchdowns. After nine years with the Bengals, he ranked seventh on the team's All-time career receptions list.

Dallas Cowboys (first stint)
On April 27, 2002, two days after being released, McGee signed with the Dallas Cowboys, reuniting with offensive coordinator Bruce Coslet, who had also served that function previously with the Bengals. He signed a three-year contract that included a $400,000 signing bonus, and base salaries of $650,000 in 2002 and $750,000 in both 2003 and 2004. He was the Cowboys' starter at tight end for all 16 games during the 2002 NFL season, catching 23 passes (third on the team) for 294 yards (third on the team) and one touchdown.

The next year, new head coach Bill Parcells signed free agent Dan Campbell and drafted future All-Pro Jason Witten, which forced his release on August 31, 2003.

Tampa Bay Buccaneers
On September 1, 2003, he was signed as a free agent by the Tampa Bay Buccaneers to replace an injured Rickey Dudley, but was cut just four days later after the signing of Daniel Wilcox.

Dallas Cowboys (second stint)
The Dallas Cowboys re-signed him on October 8, 2003, after rookie tight end Witten sustained a broken jaw and backup James Whalen injured a hamstring. He appeared in only one contest with no receptions, after Witten missed only one game and McGee was subsequently released on October 19.

New York Giants
He signed with the New York Giants on December 2, 2003, after Jeremy Shockey and Marcellus Rivers injured their knees respectively. He appeared in three games with no receptions and wasn't re-signed at the end of the season.

Personal life
McGee is the CEO of the freight company HNM Global Logistics.
He is married to NBC10 Philidelphia news anchor Jacqueline London.

References

External links
An ex-NFL star delivers

1971 births
Living people
Sportspeople from Terre Haute, Indiana
Players of American football from Indiana
American football tight ends
Michigan Wolverines football players
Cincinnati Bengals players
Tampa Bay Buccaneers players
Dallas Cowboys players
New York Giants players